Norman Njelele (27 August 1984 – 26 November 2017) was a Zimbabwean football defender.

References

1984 births
2017 deaths
Zimbabwean footballers
Black Rhinos F.C. players
Hwange Colliery F.C. players
Motor Action F.C. players
Zimbabwe international footballers
Association football defenders
Sportspeople from Harare
Zimbabwe Premier Soccer League players